San Pedro is a commune of the Melipilla Province in central Chile's Santiago Metropolitan Region.

Demographics
The population grew by 11.9% (803 persons) between the 1992 and 2002 censuses.

Administration
As a commune, San Pedro is a third-level administrative division of Chile administered by a municipal council, headed by an alcalde who is directly elected every four years. The 2012-2016 alcalde is Florentino Flores Armijo (PDC), and his council members are:
 Emilio Cerda Sagurie (PPD)
 Jeremías Vilches Mondaca (PS)
 Samuel Espinoza Vilches (PRSD) 
 Avelino Farías Piña (UDI)
 Juan Ignacio Zúñiga Godoy (RN)
 Pedro Ulloa Ulloa (PH)

Within the electoral divisions of Chile, San Pedro is represented in the Chamber of Deputies by Denise Pascal (PS) and Gonzalo Uriarte (UDI) as part of the 31st electoral district, (together with Talagante, Peñaflor, El Monte, Isla de Maipo, Melipilla, María Pinto, Curacaví, Alhué and Padre Hurtado). The commune is represented in the Senate by Guido Girardi Lavín (PPD) and Jovino Novoa Vásquez (UDI) as part of the 7th senatorial constituency (Santiago-West).

References

External links
 Official link - Municipality of San Pedro

Communes of Chile
Populated places in Melipilla Province